The Women's Center & Shelter of Greater Pittsburgh was founded in 1974 in Pittsburgh, Pennsylvania, and provides services for victims of domestic violence.  It was one of the first six centers for domestic violence to be established in the United States. The Women's Center works in conjunction with Allegheny County, the City of Pittsburgh, and surrounding municipalities to provide care and support for victims of domestic abuse.

Overview
Founded in 1974 by Ellen Berliner and Anne Steytler, the Women's Center & Shelter was one of the first six centers for domestic violence to be established in the United States. Originally situated in a small storefront in the Pittsburgh area, Berliner and Steytler founded the center to be a safe environment for women to meet after discovering the staggering prevalence of domestic violence committed against women in the United States.

Today, the Women's Center & Shelter is a resource for around 7,200 individuals per year; seeking refuge from domestic violence. The organization has resources available for women, men, gender non-conforming individuals, and children who have suffered abuse and is also positioned to provide a safe haven for individuals to heal from their trauma. The center is a resource for providing step-by-step legal guidance, dispute resolution, counseling, child-care, and child violence alternative programs.

Programs & Services
The Women's Center & Shelter has several departments and outreach programs that provide victims of domestic violence with free and confidential support. The organization provides a holistic-minded approach of healing; through supporting and empowering victims of domestic abuse.

Programs and resources provided through the Women's Center & Shelter include:
24-Hour Hotline
Emergency Shelter
Legal Advocacy
Medical Advocacy
Individual and Group Support Sessions
Children's Counseling Center
LGBTQIA+ Advocacy

References

External links 
 Women's Center & Shelter of Greater Pittsburgh Website

Organizations based in Pittsburgh
Women's organizations based in the United States
Women in Pennsylvania